Bellefont is an unincorporated community in Ford County, Kansas, United States.

History
A post office in Bellefont opened in 1878, closed in 1896, reopened in 1904, and closed permanently in 1957.

References

Further reading

External links
 Ford County maps: Current, Historic - KDOT

Unincorporated communities in Ford County, Kansas
Unincorporated communities in Kansas